59th Regiment or 59th Infantry Regiment may refer to:

 59th Regiment of Foot (disambiguation), three British Army units carried this name 
 59th (Warwickshire) Searchlight Regiment, Royal Artillery, a unit of the British Army
 59th Scinde Rifles (Frontier Force), a unit of the British Indian Army
 59th Infantry Regiment (United States), a unit of the United States Army
 59th Air Defense Artillery Regiment, a unit of the United States Army

American Civil War
Union (Northern) Army
 59th Illinois Volunteer Infantry Regiment 
 59th Indiana Infantry Regiment
 59th New York Volunteer Infantry Regiment
 59th Ohio Infantry

Confederate (Southern) Army
 59th Virginia Infantry